Misdirection may refer to:

 Misdirection (magic), a technique used when performing magic tricks
 Misdirection, a technique used for the purpose of pickpocketing
 Misdirection (pickleball), a deceptive strategy when hitting the ball
 Counter trey, a technique used in American Football
 Feint, a technique used in strategy games and warfare
 Limited hangout, a technique used by the intelligence services
 Psychobabble and technobabble, techniques used in fast talk